Stenostachys is a genus of plants in the grass family, found only in New Zealand. It is sometimes included in the genus Elymus.

 Species
 Stenostachys deceptorix Connor - South I
 Stenostachys enysii (Kirk) Barkworth & S.W.L.Jacobs - South I
 Stenostachys gracilis (Hook.f.) Connor - North+ South Is
 Stenostachys laevis (Petrie) Connor - North + South Is

References

Pooideae
Endemic flora of New Zealand
Poaceae genera
Taxa named by Nikolai Turczaninow